Stephen Jones (born 25 July 1978) is a Barbadian hurdler. He competed in the men's 110 metres hurdles at the 2004 Summer Olympics.

References

External links
 

1978 births
Living people
Athletes (track and field) at the 2004 Summer Olympics
Barbadian male hurdlers
Olympic athletes of Barbados
Place of birth missing (living people)